Ally McRoberts is a Scottish former footballer who played for Airdrieonians, Falkirk, Dumbarton, Stirling Albion and Stenhousemuir, as a forward.

References

Year of birth missing (living people)
Living people
Scottish footballers
Airdrieonians F.C. (1878) players
Falkirk F.C. players
Dumbarton F.C. players
Stirling Albion F.C. players
Stenhousemuir F.C. players
Darvel F.C. players
Scottish Football League players
Association football forwards